Shang Xi (fl. ca. 1430–1440); was a Chinese mural and scroll painter during the Ming Dynasty (1368–1644). His specific birth and death dates are not known.

Shang was born in Puyang in the Henan province. His style name was 'Weiji'. He was an imperial court painter who was awarded the title 'Commander of the Imperial Guards'.

Notes

References

Barnhart, R. M. et al. (1997). Three thousand years of Chinese painting. New Haven, Yale University Press. 

Ming dynasty painters
Year of death unknown
Year of birth uncertain
Court painters
People from Puyang
Painters from Henan